Bookman may refer to:

 Bookman (Caribbean folklore),  one of several traditional representations of the Devil in Trinidad Carnival.
 Bookman (Black Order), a character in the manga series D.Gray-man
 Bookman (occupation), a person who engages in bookselling
 Bookman (reading), a person who loves books
 Bookman (typeface), a serif typeface derived from Old Style Antique
 Bookman, South Carolina, a community in the United States
 Sony Bookman, a pre-release name for the Sony Multimedia CD-ROM Player device

People with the surname Bookman
 Dutty Boukman a self-educated slave
 Louis Bookman (1890–1943), Lithuanian-born footballer and cricketer
 Sandra Bookman (born 1959), American television news reporter and anchor
 Lt. Joe Bookman, a fictional character in the sitcom Seinfeld, played by Philip Baker Hall, in the episode The Library
 Nathan Bookman, a fictional character in the sitcom Good Times

See also
The Bookman (London)
The Bookman (New York)